Golabad (also Romanized as Golābād; also known as Monkerābād) is a village in Abarghan Rural District, in the Central District of Sarab County, East Azerbaijan Province, Iran. At the 2006 census, its population was 329, in 67 families.

References 

Populated places in Sarab County